Martin McGrath (born 1962) is an Irish retired hurler who played as a centre-forward for the Tipperary senior team.

Born in Dundrum, County Tipperary, McGrath first arrived on the inter-county scene at the age of seventeen when he first linked up with the Tipperary minor team before later joining the under-21 side. He made his senior debut during the 1982 championship. McGrath went on to enjoy a brief career and won one Munster medal.

At club level McGrath won numerous divisional championship medals as a hurler and a Gaelic footballer with Knockavilla–Donaskeigh Kickhams.

Throughout his career McGrath made 3 championship appearances for Tipperary. His retirement came following the conclusion of the 1987 championship.

Honours

Player

Tipperary
Munster Senior Hurling Championship (1): 1987
All-Ireland Minor Hurling Championship (1): 1980
Munster Minor Hurling Championship (1): 1980
All-Ireland Under-21 Hurling Championship (1): 1981
Munster Under-21 Hurling Championship (1): 1981

References

1962 births
Living people
Knockavilla-Donaskeigh Kickhams hurlers
Knockavilla-Donaskeigh Kickhams Gaelic footballers
Tipperary inter-county hurlers